Bay d'Est is a former unincorporated community in Fortune Bay District in Newfoundland and Labrador, Canada. In the 1921 census, it consisted of 40 persons in 9 households.

References

Ghost towns in Newfoundland and Labrador